USS Dace has been the name of more than one United States Navy ship, and may refer to:

United States Navy ship names